Kentucky Route 20 (KY 20) is a  state highway in Kentucky that runs from KY 18 north of Belleview to the middle segment of KY 8.

Route description

KY 20 begins heading northwest. Near Petersburg, it heads northeast, before turning to the east in Petersburg. KY 20 meets the western segment of KY 8 and provides access to Interstate 275 west. KY 20 merges to the right and passes through Idlewild. KY 20 meets KY 212 just north of the Cincinnati-Northern Kentucky Airport. KY 212 provides access to Interstate 275 east. KY 20 (Petersburg Road) is the last exit on I-275 West in Kentucky before reaching the Indiana state line.  KY 20 descends into the Ohio Valley and comes to an end at the middle segment of KY 8 west of Villa Hills.

Major intersections

References

0020
Transportation in Boone County, Kentucky